Sir William Crawford Haworth (15 April 1905 – 1 December 1984) was an Australian politician. Born in Melbourne, he was educated at state schools before attending the University of Melbourne and the Victorian College of Pharmacy. He became a pharmaceutical chemist, and served in the military 1940–44. In 1937, he was elected to the Victorian Legislative Assembly as the United Australia Party member for Albert Park; he was the Victorian Minister for Health and Housing in 1945. He was defeated in 1945, but in 1949 was elected to the Australian House of Representatives as the Liberal member for the new seat of Isaacs. He held the seat until his retirement in 1969, when he received a knighthood. Haworth died in 1984.

References

1905 births
1984 deaths
United Australia Party members of the Parliament of Victoria
Liberal Party of Australia members of the Parliament of Australia
Members of the Australian House of Representatives for Isaacs
Members of the Australian House of Representatives
Members of the Victorian Legislative Assembly
Australian Knights Bachelor
20th-century Australian politicians
People from Hawthorn, Victoria
Australian chemists
University of Melbourne alumni
Australian military personnel of World War II
Military personnel from Melbourne
Scientists from Melbourne
Politicians from Melbourne